Eugen Schüfftan (21 July 1893, in Breslau, Silesia, Germany, now Wroclaw, Poland – 6 September 1977, in New York City) was a German cinematographer.

He invented the Schüfftan process, a special effects technique that employed mirrors to insert actors into miniature sets. One of the early uses of the process was for Metropolis (1927), directed by Fritz Lang. The technique was widely used throughout the first half of the 20th century until it was supplanted by the travelling matte and bluescreen techniques.

Schüfftan won the 1962 Academy Award for Best Cinematography, Black-and-White for his work on the film The Hustler.

Selected filmography

See also
 List of German-speaking Academy Award winners and nominees

External links 
 

Literature on Eugen Schüfftan

German cinematographers
Best Cinematographer Academy Award winners
Jewish emigrants from Nazi Germany to the United States
Film people from Wrocław
1893 births
1977 deaths
People from the Province of Silesia
German emigrants to the United States